Linda Shearman is a British former competitive ice dancer. With partner Michael Phillips, she became the 1963 European champion and 1963 World silver medalist.

Results
(with Michael Phillips)

External links
 Skatabase: 1960s Worlds Results
 Skatabase: 1960s Europeans Results

British female ice dancers
Living people
Year of birth missing (living people)
World Figure Skating Championships medalists
European Figure Skating Championships medalists